There were several laws in ancient Rome that were called by the name Lex Valeria:

 Lex Valeria (82 BC), which made Sulla dictator
 Valerian and Porcian laws, regarding the right of appeal